Anachis freitagi is a species of sea snail in the family Columbellidae, the dove snails.

Description
The shell grows to a length of  7 mm.

Distribution
This species is distributed in the Atlantic Ocean along Angola, Senegal and Ghana

References

 Gofas, S.; Afonso, J.P.; Brandào, M. (Ed.). (S.a.). Conchas e Moluscos de Angola = Coquillages et Mollusques d'Angola. [Shells and molluscs of Angola]. Universidade Agostinho / Elf Aquitaine Angola: Angola. 140 pp
 Monsecour, K. (2010). Checklist of Columbellidae. pers. comm.

External links
 
 Lamy, E. (1923). Mission du Comte Jean de Polignac et de M. Louis Gain (Campagne du Sylvana 1913): mollusques testacés. Comptes Rendus du Congrès des Sociétés Savantes (Paris). 1922: 22–37
 Duclos P.L. (1840). Histoire naturelle générale et particulière de tous les genres de coquilles univalves marines a l'état vivant et fossile, publiée par monographie. Genre Colombelle. Didot, Paris. 13 pl.

freytagi
Gastropods described in 1884